Artur Ganszyniec (born 17 December 1977) is a Polish role-playing game, board game and video game designer.

He is known for being the lead story designer on The Witcher, as well as the creator of the Wolsung steampunk role-playing game and board game. His other work includes The Witcher 2: Assassins of Kings, Call of Juarez: The Cartel, Another Case Solved and Wanderlust Travel Stories.

In June 2019, he wrote a slow gaming manifesto, based on the models of slow living and slow food movements.

References

External links
 Artur Ganszyniec on Twitter

Polish video game designers
Video game writers
Board game designers
Role-playing game designers
1977 births
Living people